al-Burj is a Palestinian village located twenty kilometers southwest of Hebron. The village is in the Hebron Governorate, southern West Bank. According to the Palestinian Central Bureau of Statistics, the village had a population of 2,578 in 2007. The primary health care facilities for the village are designated by the Ministry of Health as level 2.

History
Ceramics from the Byzantine era have been found here.

Ottoman era
In 1838, Edward Robinson noted el-Burj  as a place "in ruins or deserted," part of the area between the mountains and  Gaza, but subject to the government of el-Khulil. Robinson further noted: "The ruins here consists of the remains of a square fortress, about two hundred feet on a side, situated directly upon the surface the projecting hill [..] On the eastern and southern sides a trench has been hewn out in the rock, which sees to have extended quite around the fortress. The walls are mostly broken down  [..] the general appearance of the ruin is decidedly that of a Saracenic structure; and I am disposed to regard it as one of the  line of strong Saracenic or Turkish fortresses, which appears once to have been drawn along the southern frontier of Palestine. Of these we had now listed four, viz. at Kurmul, Semua, Dhoheriyeh, and this at el-Burj".

In 1863 Victor Guérin called the place Khirbet el-Bordj and noted a maqam, shaped like a tower and dedicated to a  Sheikh Mahmoud. He also noted "several caves, some of which are used today as refuge for the shepherds, when they come to graze their herds on this mountain."

In 1883,  the PEF's Survey of Palestine  described the place, which they called Burj el Beiyarah: "Remains of a fort 200 feet side, with a fosse  on the east and south, hewn in rock. Foundations only remain of small masonry, with the joints packed with smaller stones. Round it are caves in the rocks."

British Mandate era
At the time of the 1931 census of Palestine the population of al Burj was counted under Dura.

Jordanian era
In the wake of the 1948 Arab–Israeli War, and after the 1949 Armistice Agreements, al-Burj came under Jordanian rule.

On 25 February 1953, five Arab shepherds were killed and mutilated by Israel in the so called    The Har-Zion Affair at al-Burj, including a 16-year-old.

In 1961, the population of Burj was  712.

1967, aftermath
After the  Six-Day War in 1967, al-Burj  has been under Israeli occupation.

References

Bibliography

External links
Welcome To al-Burj
Survey of Western Palestine, Map 20:   IAA, Wikimedia commons
 Al Burj Village (Fact Sheet),   Applied Research Institute–Jerusalem (ARIJ)
Al Burj Village Profile, ARIJ
 Al Burj Village Area Photo, ARIJ
 The priorities and needs for development in Al Burj village based on the community and local authorities’ assessment, ARIJ

Villages in the West Bank
Hebron Governorate
Municipalities of the State of Palestine